Deltomyza is a genus of tachinid flies in the family Tachinidae.

Species
Deltomyza australiensis (Malloch, 1930)

Distribution
Australia.

References

Exoristinae
Taxa named by Charles Henry Tyler Townsend
Tachinidae genera
Diptera of Australasia